Taís Bianca Gama de Araújo (born 25 November 1978) is a Brazilian actress, TV host and model.

Her first prominent role on television was in 1996 as protagonist of the Brazilian telenovela Xica da Silva by Walcyr Carrasco, in the Rede Manchete. In 2004, she portrayed Preta in Da Cor do Pecado created by João Emanuel Carneiro and she played Ellen, comic antagonist in the telenovela Cobras & Lagartos in 2006. In 2009, she player her first role as protagonist in primetime of Globo, one of the Helenas created by Manoel Carlos in the telenovela Viver a Vida—making her the first black woman to star in a prime time telenovela.

In 2012, she played Maria da Penha in the telenovela Cheias de Charme, the fourth lead role in her career. Her sixth leading role was playing the journalist Verônica Monteiro in technology oriented television series Geração Brasil, as part of the main trio of the plot, alongside Cláudia Abreu and Murilo Benício.

In of 2015, she took the lead of the musical comedy television series Mister Brau opposite her husband Lázaro Ramos. Taís is still touring the country with the play O Topo da Montanha, which debuted in São Paulo in 2015 and earned her a nomination for the Shell Award for Best Actress. As a television host takes part in the program Saia Justa aired at the GNT network.

In 2016, an opinion poll (Pesquisa Qualibest) pointed out Taís Araújo as the woman most admired by young people between the ages of 13 and 20, the fifth most influential artist in television and internet in the country, according to the newspaper Meio & Message in partnership with Instituto Datafolha in 2016, and the fourth most influential in 2017.

In 2017 she was elected one of the 100 most influential personalities of the world under 40 years of age by MIPAD, and for this reason she participated in a debate at Columbia University in New York. In 2015, in the matter of the English newspaper The Guardian on the series Mister Brau, the pair Taís Araújo and Lázaro Ramos was quoted like featured in the Brazilian television. Also was chosen one of the most warlike and stylish women by the American magazine Vogue. She and her husband Lázaro Ramos wer shortlisted out as the most powerful of the national showbizz, in the cover of Veja magazine published in March 2017. On 3 July 2017, she was appointed as the Defender of Rights of Black Women by UN Women Brazil, a United Nations entity for gender equality and women's empowerment.

In her personal life, she and her husband Lázaro Ramos have two children.

Life and career 
Taís Araújo was born in Rio de Janeiro on 25 November 1978 as a premature birth of seven months. She is of African, Austrian and Portuguese descent. She is daughter to Ademir de Araújo, an economist and Mercedes de Araújo, an educationist. Araújo is the second daughter of her parents and her sister, Cláudia Araújo—a doctor—seven years older than her. She is also cousin to actor and singer Marcello Melo Jr. During her childhood, she lived with her family in Méier, neighbourhood in the North Zone of Rio de Janeiro. Until the age of 8, Araújo mainly studied in private institutions. From her younger years through her large extent of her adolescence and youth she lived in Barra da Tijuca. She studied journalism in Estácio S.A. On 18 June 2011, she gave birth to her first son João Vicente de Araújo Ramos, a fruit of her marriage to Lázaro Ramos. On 7 August 2014, Araújo announced that she was with child-a girl.

Her first character in telenovelas was in Tocaia Grande in 1995, directed by Walter Avancini. A few months later, Walter Avancini was set to direct the telenovela Xica da Silva, of 1996, and chose Araújo to be the lead, in Rede Manchete. The telenovela was exported to a good number of countries. In 2000, she was voted add one of the 50 most beautiful faces in the world by the Spanish version of People magazine. In 1997, she moved to Rede Globo to star in Anjo Mau, playing Vivian. That same year, he met the director Denise Saraceni, with whom he would return to work other times in his career.
In 2004, she received Kikito's Best supporting actress at the Festival de Gramado for her work on The Daughters of the Wind.

In 2006, she played the comic villain Ellen in Cobras & Lagartos, also created by Carneiro; she had an onscreen romance with then boyfriend Lázaro Ramos.  In 2006, she was the first black presenter of the program Superbonita of the channel GNT, where it would remain by three years, until 2009. In 2008, she returned to work with João Emanuel Carneiro, in A Favorita; portraying Alicia, daughter of a corrupt deputy played by Milton Gonçalves, who for the second time, consecutively, was his father in a telenovela, the first one in Cobras & Lagartos. After the end of A Favoritas recordings in January 2009, the actress wrote her first article in the Folha de S. Paulo newspaper, in which she reported the inauguration of President Barack Obama. Separated from her husband Lázaro Ramos, she moved to Paris, with an intention to study French. She got an offer from Manoel Carlos, making her the first black actress in Brazilian television history to be the protagonist of a primetime novel—the 8 pm telenovelas that garner a large viewership—a role of Helena that has been portrayed by a number of actresses before. The telenovela Viver a Vida was not as successful, and the role of Helena was marked as the biggest failure in Araújo's career, with the total rejection of the character, being criticized by the media and the viewers. At the time, and she came to think that it would be the end of her blossoming career, going through depression for a period of two years.

In 2012, Araújo played the maid who turns singer, Maria da Penha, in the 7 pm comedy drama telenovela, Cheias de Charme, Created by Filipe Miguez and Izabel de Oliveira. In addition to film and television, she has also performed in the theater. In 2013, she lived the secretary Sheila in the series O Dentista Mascarado, a character of dubious character, owner of many facets, known in the square by various names.

In 2014, portrayed journalist Veronica in the  Geração Brasil, working again with the creators Filipe Miguez and Izabel de Oliveira. Taís was cast to play Michele in the series Mister Brau, with her spouse Lázaro Ramos. In 2015, alongside Lázaro Ramos, she made her debut in the play the Top of the Mountain that earned her nomination for the contest Shell Prize of Better Actress, and took more than 100 thousand people to the theater. In 2016 starred in her seventh film, The Cup Steal, in the role of Dolores inspired by Adele Fatima.

Personal life
Taís dated the singer and television host Netinho de Paula, at her time in the group Negritude Júnior in the late 1990s until the early 2000s. After the relationship with Netinho ended, Taís dated and became engaged to the jiu-jitsu fighter Marcio Feitosa, with whom they broke up in 2004. Shortly thereafter, she began dating Lázaro Ramos, whom she married in January 2007. In March 2008, the actors decided to separate amicably. Araújo got into a relationship with Allan Espinosa, son of football coach Valdir Espinosa. Months later, rumors began circulating that she and Ramos had reconciled. They announced their reconciliation in April 2009. On 18 June 2011, her first son, João Vicente, was born. In mid 2014, Araújo announced that she was expectant. Her daughter Maria Antônia was born on 23 January 2015, exactly at 8:45 am in the maternity ward of Barra da Tijuca, in the West Zone of Rio; Claudia Araújo—Araújo's sister and obstetrician gynecologist—was one of the doctors who did the surgery.

On the night of 31 October 2015, the actress's Facebook page was the subject of racist comments, and she stated in a posting: "I will not be intimidated, I will not lower my head either." The hashtag #SomosTodosTaísAraújo became a trending topic on the morning of 1 November. The same case occurred with the journalist Maria Júlia Coutinho and also the actresses Sheron Menezes and Cris Vianna, victims of cyberbullying. The Office of the Prosecutor for Crimes of Informatics launched an investigation to determine the crime. In 2016, for her fight against racism, she received the honor in the Trip Transformadores Prize, of Trip Magazine.

In 2017 she was invited to participate in a Tedx lecture in São Paulo, telling an audience of about nine thousand people about her experiences in social activism in the struggle for equal rights in society. Also in 2017, she was elected one of the 100 most influential Afro-descendant personalities in the world under the age of 40, and received the award in New York. Also in 2017, received a tribute in the Award Claudia promoted by the Claudia Magazine, of Editora Abril, in São Paulo, in the category hors concours, honor granted to the people that act by the equality of rights in the society.

Filmography

Television

Film

Theatre

Awards and nominations

References

External links 

 
 

Living people
1978 births
20th-century Brazilian actresses
21st-century Brazilian actresses
20th-century Brazilian businesspeople
21st-century Brazilian businesspeople
Activists from Rio de Janeiro (city)
Actresses from Rio de Janeiro (city)
Afro-Brazilian feminists
Brazilian feminists
Afro-Brazilian actresses
Afro-Brazilian female models
Brazilian female models
Afro-Brazilian television hosts
Brazilian film actresses
Brazilian telenovela actresses
Brazilian musical theatre actresses
Brazilian theatre managers and producers
People from Rio de Janeiro (city)
Brazilian people of Austrian descent
Brazilian people of Portuguese descent
Brazilian stage actresses
Brazilian television actresses
Brazilian philanthropists
Brazilian women philanthropists